Rodrick or Rodricks may refer to:

People by given name
 Rod Rutledge (born 1975), American NFL football player
 Rodrick Del Rodgers (born 1960), American NFL football player
 Rod Hill (born 1959), American NFL football player
 Rod Monroe (American football) (born 1976), American football player
 Rodrick Rhodes (born 1973), American professional basketball player

People by surname
 Michael Rodrick (born 1970), American actor
 Stephen Rodrick, American journalist
 Dan Rodricks, American columnist and radio talk-show host
 Wendell Rodricks (1960–2020), Indian fashion designer

Other uses
 18689 Rodrick, an asteroid
 Rodrick Bridge, a historical bridge in Licking, Ohio; see List of bridges on the National Register of Historic Places in Ohio
 Rodrick Heffley, a Diary of a Wimpy Kid character

See also
 Roderick
 Kirby (disambiguation)